Edwin Torres (born January 7, 1931) is a former New York State Supreme Court judge and author of Puerto Rican descent, who wrote the 1975 novel Carlito's Way. His book was the basis for the 1993 movie of the same name, starring Al Pacino, and for the 1979 book After Hours, the sequel to Carlito's Way.

Early years
Both of Torres's parents emigrated from Jayuya, Puerto Rico, and settled in the barrio in Manhattan's Spanish Harlem, where Torres was born. Growing up in poverty, Torres graduated from Stuyvesant High School. From there he attended City College of the City University of New York, followed by the Brooklyn Law School.

Legal career
In 1958, Torres was admitted to the New York State Bar. In 1959, as an assistant district attorney, Torres participated in the prosecution of Sal "the Capeman" Agron.  Shortly thereafter he became a criminal defense attorney.

In 1977, Torres was appointed to the New York State Criminal Court. In 1980 he was selected to the State Supreme Court, where he served as a justice in the Twelfth Judicial District in New York City. The Supreme Court has jurisdiction over felony cases, and Torres presided over a number of high-profile murder cases.

The New York Times called Torres “one of the city’s most experienced and sternest judges and a man known for a crackling eloquence both in and out of the courtroom.” A famous exchange  involved his telling a convicted murderer, “Sucker, your parole officer ain’t been born yet.”

In the Law & Order: Criminal Intent season 1 episode "Semi-Professional," the Judge Raoul Sabatelli character is said to have been inspired by Judge Torres.

He retired from the bench in 2008 and since then has served on the New York State Athletic Commission.

Writer of fiction
Torres’ tough upbringing in Manhattan and his work in the criminal justice system enabled him to create realistic crime fiction characters and plots. Richie Narvaez called him "the Granddaddy—¡El Abuelo!—of Latino crime fiction in the U.S. For a brief while in the 1970s, Torres picked up the mantle of Chester Himes and Miguel Piñero, keeping the door cracked open for crime fiction writers who happen to be ethnically diverse. Without Torres we might not have gotten Ernesto Quiñonez’ Bodega Dreams, Carolina Garcia-Aguilera’s Lupe Solano series, or even Walter Mosley’s Devil in a Blue Dress."

Torres wrote Carlito's Way in 1975 and its sequel After Hours in 1979; both novels follow the exploits of Carlito Brigante, a fictional Puerto Rican drug kingpin and hustler who ends up doing time in Sing-Sing and struggles to go "straight" after his release. The New Yorker praised Carlito’s Way: “It is in the grisly tradition of Little Caesar, The Jones Men, and The Friends of Eddie Coyle, and it is the equal of any of them.”

Another novel, Q & A (1977), portrays the investigation of a decorated New York City police lieutenant suspected of corruption.
Of the book, The New York Times noted, “Judge Torres infuses these nearly current events with so much life and style that you can almost smell the musty air of 100 Centre Street.”

Film adaptations
A film adaptation of Q & A was released in 1990, directed by Sidney Lumet, and it starred Nick Nolte and Armand Assante. After Hours was filmed in 1993, but used the title Carlito's Way to avoid being confused with Martin Scorsese's 1985 film After Hours. The film starred Al Pacino and Sean Penn, under the direction of Brian De Palma. The novel Carlito's Way was filmed in 2005 and released under the title Carlito's Way: Rise to Power.

See also

List of Hispanic/Latino American jurists
List of Puerto Rican writers
List of Puerto Ricans
Puerto Rican literature

References

External links
  Edwin Torres IGN DVD speaks to the scribe responsible for Carlito's Way and its prequel, Rise to Power.
  Puerto Rico Herald Puerto Rico Profile: Judge Edwin Torres
Edwin Torres (judge) on IMDb

1931 births
Brooklyn Law School alumni
Carlito's Way
City College of New York alumni
Hispanic and Latino American judges
Living people
New York Supreme Court Justices
Organized crime novelists
People from East Harlem
Puerto Rican writers
Stuyvesant High School alumni
New York State Athletic Commissioners